École secondaire catholique Béatrice-Desloges (ESCBD, Béatrice-Desloges Catholic High School) is a French language high school  in the community of Orléans, in the eastern part of Ottawa, Ontario, Canada. The school also houses a community child day care centre, and is currently the largest or second largest and most populated French high school in Ontario, either surpassing or coming very close to that of the Thériault Catholic High School located in Timmins.

History
The school is named after Béatrice Desloges, an early twentieth century Franco-Ontarian teacher in Ottawa who, with her sister Diane, successfully opposed Regulation 17, which aimed at rendering illegal all French language teaching in the province of Ontario.

The school opened its doors in 1997, in order to give more space to the overcrowded Garneau high school in Orléans, Ontario. The student population grew rapidly when the 7th and 8th grade groups were incorporated to the 9-12 group in 2001, and since then, the school has been undergoing expansion in order to accommodate the growing number of students.

In 2006, it was announced that an entirely new three-story section would be built where the previous school extension stood, and would be entirely dedicated to the 7th and 8th graders, thus separating them from older high school students. In addition to this, it was announced that a modern amphitheatre would be built inside, meaning that the previous theatre could be removed. This allowed the expansion of the cafeteria, which had been largely criticized for failing to accommodate the number of students over the years, and also allowed the addition of a new atrium, a gymnasium, and an exercise room. The gym was named after Olympian Lise Meloche. Although most of the construction was finished by the end of August 2007, the amphitheatre would not be opened until the beginning of spring 2008, costing in total a near twelve million dollars.

On March 2, 2007, the school was awarded the Prix jeunesse (youth prize) by the organization Communications et société for World Social Communications Day, for its unifying religious and artistic interpretation in "Le chemin de croix du XXIe siècle" (The Way of the Cross of the 21st Century).

Programs offered

Académie des arts
Béatrice-Desloges offers a Specialized Arts Program called Académie des arts (previously known as PSA) for students which starts from grade 7. Once a student officially enrolls into ADA by grade 9, he or she has to choose a specific domain of specialization: either Music, Visual and Digital Arts, or Drama. Within the Drama specialization, a partnership with the École nationale de l'humour (National Comedy school) of Montreal is offered for specific modules.

OptiMax
The school also offers a program for gifted students named "OptiMax". To be admitted to the program the student must demonstrate high academic capabilities, such as a 79% overall average in the following subjects: French, mathematics, sciences, social studies (history and geography), as well as a minimum grade of 75% in each of those subjects. There are categories within the program pertaining to specific age groups. Grades 7 and 8 are in the Exploration program and Grades 9 and 10 in the Planification program.

Notable alumni
Claude Giroux − NHL hockey player for the Ottawa Senators
Vincent De Haître − Speed skater who participated in the 2014 Winter Olympics in Sochi
Eli Ankou − NFL defensive tackle

See also
List of high schools in Ontario

References

External links

Official school website 
Specialized Arts Program (PSA) website 
Centre d'enrichissement Optimax  
Official site of school district  
List of French Ontario school 

Educational institutions established in 1997
French-language schools in Ottawa
French-language high schools in Ontario
High schools in Ottawa
Catholic secondary schools in Ontario
1997 establishments in Ontario
Middle schools in Ottawa